52nd Street is a -long one-way street traveling west to east across Midtown Manhattan, New York City. A short section of it was known as the city's center of jazz performance from the 1930s to the 1950s.

Jazz center

Following the repeal of Prohibition in 1933, 52nd Street replaced 133rd Street as "Swing Street" of the city. The blocks of 52nd Street between Fifth Avenue and Seventh Avenue became renowned for the abundance of jazz clubs and lively street life. The street was convenient to musicians playing on Broadway and the 'legitimate' nightclubs and was also the site of a CBS studio. Musicians who played for others in the early evening played for themselves on 52nd Street.

In the period from 1930 through the early 1950s, 52nd Street clubs hosted such jazz musicians as Louis Prima, Art Tatum, Fats Waller, Billie Holiday, Trummy Young, Harry Gibson, Nat Jaffe, Dizzy Gillespie, Thelonious Monk, Charlie Parker, Miles Davis, Marian McPartland, and many more. Although musicians from all schools performed there, after Minton's Playhouse in uptown Harlem, 52nd Street was the second most important place for the dissemination of bebop;. In fact, a tune called "52nd Street Theme" by Thelonious Monk became a bebop anthem and jazz standard.

Virtually every great jazz player and singer of the era performed at clubs:

52nd, between 6th & 7th
Kelly's Stable, 137 W 52
The Hickory House, 144 W 52

52nd, between 5th & 6th
21 Club, 21 W 52 (1929–2020)
Leon & Eddie's, 33 W 52
Famous Door
 35 W 52 (Mar 1935–May 1936)
 66 W 52 (Dec 1937–Nov 1943)
 201 W 52 (Nov 1943–1944)
 56 W 52 (1947–1950)
 Note: The Cotton Club (unconnected to the defunct club with the same name) opened in 1943 on the site formerly occupied by the Famous Door; the club was initially managed by Russell Carter
Jimmy Ryan's, 53 W 52 (1934–1962)
154 W 54th (1962–1983)
Spotlight Club, 56 W 52
Club Samoa
 62 W 52 (1940–1943)
 became a strip club in 1943
The Onyx
 35 W 52 (1927–1933) (owned by Joe Helbock)
 72 W 52 (1933–1937) (owned by Joe Helbock)
 62 W 52 (1937–1939) (owned by Joe Helbock, et al.)
 57 W 52 (1942–1949) (unrelated to the original Onyx)
 became a strip club in 1949
Yacht Club, 66 W 52
Club Downbeat, 66 W 52
Club Carousel, 66 W 52
3 Deuces, 72 W 52

Disc jockey Symphony Sid frequently did live broadcasts from the street which were transmitted across the country.

By the late 1940s, the jazz scene began moving elsewhere around the city and urban renewal began to take hold of the street. By the 1960s, most of the legendary clubs were razed or fell into disrepair. The last jazz club there closed in 1968, though one remains as a restaurant. Today, the street is full of banks, shops, and department stores and shows little trace of its jazz history. The block from 5th to 6th Avenues is formally co-named "Swing Street" and one block west is called "W. C. Handys Place". The 21 Club was the sole surviving club on 52nd Street that also existed during the 1940s. It closed in 2020. The venue for the original Birdland at 1674 Broadway (between 52nd & 53rd), which came into existence in 1949, is now a strip club. The current Birdland is on 44th Street, between 8th and 9th Avenues.

Notable places on 52nd Street
This is a list of notable places within one block of 52nd Street.

West Side Highway
The route begins at the West Side Highway (New York Route 9A). Opposite the intersection is the New York Passenger Ship Terminal and the Hudson River
Hustler Club on south side
De Witt Clinton Park on north (the whole west side neighborhood of Clinton derives its name from the park
Studios of The Daily Show broadcast (south)

Eleventh Avenue
The section between Eleventh and Tenth Avenues is signed "Joe Hovarth Way" in tribute to Joseph Hovarth (1945–1995) who located the Police Athletic League William J. Duncan Center on the block after moving from its original location. The Duncan Center is named for a patrolman who was shot while chasing a stolen car in the neighborhood on May 17, 1930.

Tenth Avenue
Closed Midtown Branch of Saint Vincent's Catholic Medical Center (formerly St. Clares Hospital) (south)

Ninth Avenue
The Manhattan School – Public School 35, special ed. (317 West 52nd) (north)
Radio City Station Post Office (zip code 10019) (south)
The Link (south), 43-story, 215–unit, glass tower condominium (height = 471 feet), opened in 2007 on site of the S.I.R. (Studio Instrument Rentals, Inc.) building at 310 W 52nd, known as the Palm Gardens Building. S.I.R. occupied the building from 1974 until 2004. Cheetah, the well-known club that had once been at 53rd and Broadway, occupied the Palm Gardens building from 1968 to 1974. Cheetah became a popular Latin-American dance club that helped popularize Salsa to mainstream America.

Eighth Avenue
Neil Simon Theatre (south)
August Wilson Theatre (north)
Gallagher's Steak House (south)
Novotel 26-floor,  hotel opened in 1984 (south)
1675 Broadway - 35-floor,  office building opened in 1990 (north)

Broadway
Sheraton Manhattan Hotel at Times Square, 22-story,  opened in 1962 (south)

Seventh Avenue
Seventh to Sixth is signed W.C. Handy's Place
AXA Center, 54-floor,  office tower opened in 1986 (south)
Sheraton New York Hotel & Towers, 51-story,  opened in 1962 (north)
Flatotel New York City, 46-floor,  Flatotel that opened in 1992 and is the street's(north)
Credit Lyonnais Building 45-floor,  office building that opened in 1964 (north)
1285 Avenue of the Americas, 42-story,  office building (south)

Sixth and a Half Avenue
In the middle of block between Sixth and Seventh Avenues is a pedestrian corridor named by the city "Sixth and a Half Avenue", which runs from 51st to 57th Streets.

Sixth Avenue
Sixth Avenue to Fifth Avenue is signed "Swing Street".
AXA Financial Center 43-story,  completed in 1963. It has a large Thomas Hart Benton mural in lobby. (south)
CBS Building, headquarters of the network and popularly referred to as "Black Rock" (north)
31 West 52nd Street 30-floor,  completed in 1986 originally for the E.F. Hutton headquarters. Currently the New York office of the international law firm, Clifford Chance (north) and the New York office of investment bank TD Securities, as well as the New York office for the international law firm Holland & Knight LLP.
Paley Center for the Media (north)
75 Rockefeller Center, 33-story,  building completed in 1947 the last of the original Rockefeller Center buildings that was originally used for the headquarters of the Rockefeller Esso Oil Company (north)
21 Club (north)
666 Fifth Avenue (north)
650 Fifth Avenue (south) 36-story,  office tower completed in 1978

Fifth Avenue
The Street between Fifth and Madison is signed "Place de Cartier" because of the Cartier SA store at 653 Fifth Avenue (south).
Olympic Tower (south)
Austrian Cultural Forum Building for Austria
Hanover Bank Building, 30-story,  completed in 1962
Omni Berkshire Place (north)
Look Building (south)

Madison Avenue
Park Avenue Plaza Building, 45-story,  building completed in 1981 above the Racquet and Tennis Club (north)

Park Avenue
Seagram Building, 38-floor,  building completed in 1958, formerly home to the Four Seasons Restaurant (north)
345 Park Avenue, 44-story,  building completed in 1969 (south)

Lexington Avenue
52nd between Lexington and Third Avenue is signed Israel Bonds Way (the Development Corporation for Israel which issues the bonds is headquartered at the intersection in the Grolier Building).
Grolier Building 33-story,  building completed in 1958
599 Lexington Avenue, 50-story,  building completed in 1986 (north)
150 East 52nd Street, 35-story,  building completed in 1983

Third Avenue
875 3rd Avenue 29-story,  building completed in 1983 (north)
MacMillan Building 31-story,  building completed in 1966
Hungary Consulate
Zambia Mission to the United Nations
Rockefeller Guest House, 242 East 52nd Street (south)

Second Avenue
Thailand Consulate and Mission to the United Nations

First Avenue
52nd Street is two-way traffic east of First Avenue since it dead ends on a bluff above the FDR Drive.
Southgate Apartment
Rivergate Apartment
450 East 52nd - "The Campanile" is a 14-story brick cooperative apartment building overlooking the East River. It was home to celebrities such as Greta Garbo and John Lennon.

In literature and popular culture
In W. H. Auden's poem "September 1, 1939", about the Second World War, Auden narrates himself as being on 52nd Street.

A 1948 amateur recording of Charlie Parker at the Onyx Club, Bird on 52nd St., was released by Jazz Workshop in 1957.

Billy Joel has a studio album titled 52nd Street. The songs, including the hit single "Honesty", have a jazz flavoring not found on his other albums.

Toshiki Kadomatsu made a song titled "52nd Street "Akiko"" which is on his album Sea is a Lady.

The Twilight Zone, episode 32, A Passage for Trumpet, refers to the jazz clubs of 52nd Street.

Van Morrison's 1972 song "Saint Dominic's Preview" includes the lyrics "And meanwhile we're over on a 52nd Street apartment / Socializing with the wino few".

References
Notes

External links

52nd Street: A New York Songline - virtual walking tour

052
Midtown Manhattan